Ballymore is a civil parish in County Westmeath, Ireland.

Ballymore is one of nine civil parishes in the barony of Rathconrath in the Province of Leinster.

Ballymore civil parish comprises the village of Ballymore and 22 townlands: Ballinlig Lower, Ballinlig Upper, Ballymore, Ballynacorra, Ballynafearagh, Calliaghstown, Carricknagower, Cloncullen, Dungolman, Glebe, Harrystown, Lugacaha, Milltown, Moneynamanagh or Umma Beg, Moyvoughly, Mullenmeehan, Newtown, Raheen, Shinglis, Snimnagorta, Toorevagh, Umma Beg or Moneynamanagh and Umma More.

The neighbouring civil parishes are: Forgney and Noughaval (County Longford) to the north, Killare to the east, Ballyloughloe and Kilcumreragh to the south and Drumraney and Noughaval to the west.

References

External links
Ballymore civil parish at the IreAtlas Townland Data Base
Ballymore civil parish at townlands.ie
Ballymore civil parish at The Placenames Database of Ireland

Civil parishes of County Westmeath